Martemyanovo is a rural locality (a village) in Novoselskoye Rural Settlement, Kovrovsky District, Vladimir Oblast, Russia. The population was 14 as of 2010.

Geography 
Martemyanovo is located 25 km south of Kovrov (the district's administrative centre) by road. Churilovo is the nearest rural locality.

References 

Rural localities in Kovrovsky District